Patricia Vila (born 20 January 1972) is a Mexican former synchronized swimmer who competed in the 1996 Summer Olympics.

References

1972 births
Living people
Mexican synchronized swimmers
Olympic synchronized swimmers of Mexico
Synchronized swimmers at the 1996 Summer Olympics